Eugene Codrington, (born November 5, 1953) is a British karateka. He has an  8th Dan black belt in karate and is the winner of multiple European Karate Championships and was part of first non- Japanese team to win a World Karate Championships. Eugene is a  founder member of the English Karate Governing Board (EKGB) for whom he is Senior Coach.

Eugene Codrington was born in Hope Bay, Portland, Jamaica in 1953. Having settled in the UK at an early age, Eugene showed an exceptional aptitude for sport and physical activity and was a keen competitor in many sports as a young man. He began his Karate training at the legendary Temple Dojo in Birmingham under the tutelage of Takamizawa Sensei (Toru) in 1969. After 2½ years of diligent training Eugene was award his 1st Dan black belt. Already a keen competition fighter Eugene began to win competitions all over the country and in 1974, Eugene won his first of five European championships, then 11 years later, in April 1985; he was collecting his fifth British Championship trophy. He was World Champion as a member of the British Team who beat the Japanese for the first time ever in 1975, and a finalist in the world individual Championships two years later in Tokyo.

Achievements

 1975  European Karate Championships Kumite  Gold Medal
 1978  European Karate Championships  Kumite  Gold Medal
 1975  World Karate Championships Team Kumite Gold Medal
 1977  World Karate Championships Kumite Silver Medal

References

1953 births
Sportspeople from Birmingham, West Midlands
Living people
Jamaican emigrants to the United Kingdom
English male karateka
Wadō-ryū practitioners
Karate coaches
Jamaican male karateka
Black British sportspeople
British male karateka